Michigan's 31st Senate district is one of 38 districts in the Michigan Senate. The 31st district was created by the 1850 Michigan Constitution, as the 1835 constitution only permitted  a maximum of eight senate districts. It has been represented by Republican Roger Victory since 2023, succeeding fellow Republican Kevin Daley.

Geography
District 31 encompasses parts of Allegan and Ottawa counties.

2011 Apportionment Plan
District 31, as dictated by the 2011 Apportionment Plan, covered all of Bay, Lapeer, and Tuscola Counties along Saginaw Bay, including the communities of Bay City, Essexville, Caro, Vassar, Lapeer, Imlay City, Almont, Bangor Township, Monitor Township, and Hampton Township.

The district was exactly split between Michigan's 5th and 10th congressional districts, and overlapped with the 82nd, 84th, 96th, and 98th districts of the Michigan House of Representatives.

List of senators

Recent election results

2018

2014

Federal and statewide results in District 31

Historical district boundaries

References 

31
Bay County, Michigan
Lapeer County, Michigan
Tuscola County, Michigan